The Letov Š-4 was a Czechoslovak single-bay, unstaggered biplane fighter and trainer in the 1920s.

Production history
The Š-4 was first created in 1922 as an intended successor to the SPAD S.VII and S.XIII, in service with the newly created Czechoslovak Air Force. It first flew in 1922, with fabric-covered wooden wings and a metal fuselage and tail.

Operational history
The Czechoslovak Air Force ordered 20 Š-4s in 1922 and these were delivered in early 1923. The plane lived out the 1920s as a fighter and trainer, but by 1927 difficulties were being experienced due to the low manufacturing quality of the Š-4. As a result, all remaining Š-4s were upgraded to Š-4a trainer aircraft in 1928.

List of operators
 
 Czechoslovak Air Force

Specifications

See also

References

Bibliography

 

1920s Czechoslovakian fighter aircraft
Š-4
Biplanes
Aircraft first flown in 1922